Crepidium quadridentatum is a species of plant in the family Orchidaceae, endemic to the Philippines

Description

Taxonomy

Distribution and habitat

Ecology
found in

References

quadridentatum
Orchids of the Philippines